Charles Alston (1683 – 22 November 1760) was a Scottish botanist.

Career
Alston was born in Hamilton, Lanarkshire, and was apparently raised by the Duke and Duchess of Hamilton.

In 1715 he went to Leyden to study under the Dutch physician Hermann Boerhaave. On his return to Scotland he became lecturer in materia medica and botany at Edinburgh and also superintendent of the botanical gardens. He was a critic of Linnaeus's system of plant classification. 

He was appointed Regius Keeper of the Royal Botanic Garden Edinburgh in 1716, holding the position until 1760.

Family
He married first Robina Lockhart.  Issue-

Robina born 21 Jun 1731 in Canongate who married in Edinburgh on 6 Jan 1754 to Alexander Birnie, of Bromhill, b 1708 d before 1770

On 3 October 1741 he married (secondly) in Canongate Kirk Bethia Birnie (b. 1706) daughter of John Birnie, of Broomhill.

He is buried in Canongate Kirkyard on the Royal Mile in Edinburgh, immediately east of the church.

Upon his death, his significant library was auctioned in Edinburgh.

Botanical Recognition

The tree genus Alstonia is named after him.

References

Further reading

External links 

Alston | Charles | 1683-1760 | scientific writer, published by the University of Edinburgh NAHSTE program.

Scottish botanists
1683 births
1760 deaths
Academics of the University of Edinburgh
Leiden University alumni
People from Hamilton, South Lanarkshire
Burials at the Canongate Kirkyard
18th-century British botanists
18th-century Scottish medical doctors